Bismuth vanadate is the inorganic compound with the formula BiVO4. It is a bright yellow solid. It is widely studied as visible light photo-catalyst with a narrow band gap of less than 2.4 eV. It is a representative of "complex inorganic colored pigments," or CICPs. More specifically, bismuth vanadate is a mixed-metal oxide. Bismuth vanadate is also known under the Colour Index International as C.I. Pigment Yellow 184.  It occurs naturally as the rare minerals pucherite, clinobisvanite, and dreyerite.

History and uses
Bismuth vanadate is a bright yellow powder and may have a slight green tint. When used as a pigment it contains a high Chroma and excellent hiding power. In nature, bismuth vanadate can be found as the mineral pucherite, clinobisvanite, and dreyerite depending on the particular polymorph formed. Its synthesis was first recorded in a pharmaceutical patent in 1924 and began to be used readily as a pigment in the mid-1980s. Today it is manufactured across the world for pigment use.

Properties
Most commercial bismuth vanadate pigments are based on monoclinic (clinobisvanite) and tetragonal (dreyerite) structures though in the past two phase systems involving a 4:3 relationship between bismuth vanadate and bismuth molybdate (Bi2MoO6) have been used.

As a photocatalyst
BiVO4 has received much attention as a photocatalyst for water splitting and for remediation.
In the monoclinic phase, BiVO4 is an n-type photoactive semiconductor with a bandgap of 2.4 eV, which has been investigated for water splitting after doping with W and Mo. BiVO4 photoanodes have demonstrated record solar-to-hydrogen (STH) conversion efficiencies of 5.2% for flat films and 8.2% for WO3@BiVO4 core-shell nanorods (highest for metal-oxide photo-electrode) with the advantage of a very simple and cheap material.

Production
While most CICPs are formed exclusively through high temperature calcination, bismuth vanadate can be formed from a series of pH controlled precipitation reactions. These reactions can be carried out with or without the presence of molybdenum depending on the desired final phase. It is also possible to start with the parent oxides (Bi2O3 and V2O5) and perform a high temperature calcination to achieve a pure product.

References

Vanadates
Bismuth compounds